Charles Dorian (June 27, 1891 – October 21, 1942) was an American assistant director and film actor. He appeared in 26 films between 1915 and 1920. He won an Academy Award in 1933 for Best Assistant Director. He was born in Santa Monica, California and died in 1942 in Albuquerque, New Mexico from a heart attack.

Selected filmography
 All Night (1918)
 Society for Sale (1918)
 The Red-Haired Cupid (1918)

References

External links

1891 births
1942 deaths
American male film actors
American male silent film actors
Male actors from California
Best Assistant Director Academy Award winners
Film directors from California
20th-century American male actors
Film directors from New Mexico